"Lyra" is a song written, produced, and performed by British recording artist Kate Bush, from the 2007 soundtrack album The Golden Compass from the film of the same name. It is used in the closing credits of the film. Bush was commissioned to write the song, with the request that it make reference to the lead character, Lyra Belacqua.

Background
According to Del Palmer, Bush was asked to do the song at very short notice and the whole project was completed in 10 days. The song was produced and recorded by Bush in her own studio, and features the Magdalen College, Oxford choir. It contains the introduction of an unused song written for Disney's Dinosaur.

Critical reception and recognition
"Lyra" was nominated for the International Press Academy's Satellite Award for Best Original Song.

Chart performance
The song reached number 187 on the UK Singles Chart, charting on downloads from the album alone.

References

Kate Bush songs
Songs written by Kate Bush
2007 songs
Songs written for films
Songs about fictional female characters